The National Self-Government of Germans in Hungary (LdU; , MNOÖ) is the nationwide representative organization of the German minority in Hungary.

History 

After electing minority self-governments in 1994, the electoral assembly of the German minority elected the political and cultural representative body of the Germans of Hungary, the National Self-Government of the Germans in Hungary, on 11 March 1995. According to the opportunities offered by the 2011. CLXXIX. Nationality Act, it wants to implement a modern minority policy.

Aims 
Its main aims are to preserve and support the language, the intellectual heritage, the historical traditions and the German identity in Hungary. That includes the preservation of the German mother tongue in cultural areas, the teaching of German language in the Hungarian school system and in the field of international relations and the exchange of German relations by partnerships and programs.

The implementation of cultural autonomy, the takeover of the German institutions in Hungary, ensures the main activity of LdU.

At the same time, it supports co-operation of Hungary and its neighbours, above all with German-speaking countries.

It is the umbrella organization of 406 local minority self-governments and more than 500 cultural groups and other German associations of Hungary.

Leaders 
 Ottó Heinek (1999–2018)
 Olívia Schubert (2018–2019)
 Ibolya Hock-Englender (2019– )

Electoral results 
Since 2014, voters of ethnic minorities in Hungary are able to vote on nationality lists. The minorities can obtain a preferential mandate if they reach the quarter of the ninety-third part (which is ) of the list votes. Nationalities who did not get a mandate could send a nationality spokesman to the National Assembly.

In the 2018 parliamentary election, Imre Ritter was elected as the first German parliamentary spokesman in the history of the National Assembly.

National Assembly

References 

Political parties in Hungary
German diaspora political parties
Ethnic groups in Hungary
Hungarian German communities
1995 establishments in Hungary
Political parties established in 1995